The Hoankyoku ( Hiragana: ほあんきょく) was an intelligence agency established in the State of Manchuria.

Background 
The State of Manchuria was founded in 1932, but within the country there were many anti-establishment forces operating. As well as bandits and remnants of former military parties, there were Kuomintang, Communist Party of China, and Soviet underground groups operating. Above all else, members of the Kuomintang had infiltrated the Manchurian bureaucracy.

The police, whose job it was to crack down on anti-establishment forces, was made up of many ethnicities, making the concealing of classified information difficult. Therefore, a secret organisation that possessed a level of confidentiality higher than even the Tokkō, and whose existence itself was also secret, was considered.

The Hoankyoku was established in December 1937 (Kokutoku 4). As it was a secret organisation it was disguised as a division of the police. It had a close relationship with the Kwantung Army, and received guidance from members of the Kwantung Army's secret police. All heads within the organisation were Japanese.

Structure 
As at 1944 (Kokutoku 11)
 Division 1 (general affairs)
 Division 2 (investigations)
 Division 3 (general counterintelligence)
 Division 4 (foreign counterintelligence)
 Division 5 (secret information)
 Division 6 (wireless counterintelligence and unauthorised radio-wave search)
 Division 7 (communication counterintelligence)
 Division 8 (secret war science)
 Ryokuen Institute (training)

Bibliography 

 満州国史編纂刊行会編『満州国史 各論』満蒙同胞援護会、1970年

Defunct intelligence agencies
Military branches of Manchukuo
Secret police